Alexandre, Chevalier de Chaumont (1640 – 28 January 1710 in Paris) was the first French ambassador for King Louis XIV in Siam in 1685. He was accompanied on his mission by Abbé de Choisy, the Jesuit Guy Tachard, and Father Bénigne Vachet of the Société des Missions Étrangères de Paris. He was also bringing back to Siam the two ambassadors of the 1684 First Siamese Embassy to France.

He tried without success to convert King Narai the Great to Catholicism and to conclude significant commercial treaties.

He is best remembered for his memoirs describing life in 17th century Siam.

A "Chevalier de Chaumont" is also mentioned several times in the Jesuit Relations.

See also
 France–Thailand relations

Notes

External links
 Chevalier de Chaumont (French)

1640 births
1710 deaths
Knights of Chaumont
17th-century French diplomats
French memoirists
French male non-fiction writers
Ambassadors of France to the Ayutthaya Kingdom
18th-century memoirists